Copen is an unincorporated community in Braxton County, central West Virginia, United States. The community is located at the confluence of Copen  and Bull Fork Creeks. Its most famous resident was Melvin Wine (1909–2003), an acclaimed old-time fiddler.

Neighboring towns: Flower; 1.5 miles west,  Arnette; southeast, Burnsville; east, Bower; north

The community has the name of John Copen, a pioneer settler.

References

Unincorporated communities in Braxton County, West Virginia
Unincorporated communities in West Virginia
Coal towns in West Virginia